The Battle of Sonipat was fought between Sikhs and the Mughal Empire in 1709.

Background and Battle
In 1708, Banda Singh Bahadur became the leader of the Sikh army and he was sent to Punjab by Guru Gobind Singh to fight against the Mughal Empire. Khanda, Sonipat village witnessed the Battle of Sonipat against the Mughals and won the battle under the military leadership of Banda Singh Bahadur. He first camped at Khanda, Sonipat village, with an army of 500, and then marched to Sonipat, attacked the town, and threw an open challenge to the Mughal Empire. The Mughal faujdar of Sonipat was utterly unprepared and he was routed in the battle and was defeated. The Sikhs then looted the state treasury.

References

Sonepat
Sonepat
Sonepat
Sikh Empire
18th century in India
Sonepat
1709 in India